Marcelo Nicolás Benítez (born 13 January 1991) is an Argentine professional footballer who plays as a left-back or left midfielder for Argentine Primera División side Rosario Central on loan from Defensa y Justicia.

Career
Benítez's professional career began in 2011 with Defensa y Justicia, with whom he made his debut with in March 2011 against Independiente Rivadavia in Primera B Nacional. Almost a year later, Benítez scored the first goal of his career in a 3–2 defeat at the Estadio Gigante de Arroyito against Rosario Central. Between 2010–11 and 2013–14, Benítez made eighty-eight appearances and scored four goals for Defensa, almost half of those matches came during the club's promotion-winning campaign of 2013–14. His first top-flight appearance came on 9 August 2014 versus Racing Club.

In July 2016, Benítez joined Godoy Cruz on loan. One goal in twenty-three league matches followed in Mendoza. On 7 July 2017, Benítez completed a loan move to Belgrano. A year after, he joined Vitória of Brazil's Série A on a temporary basis.

On 9 February 2022, Benítez joined Rosario Central on a one-year loan deal with a purchase option.

Career statistics
.

References

External links

1991 births
Living people
Sportspeople from Buenos Aires Province
Argentine footballers
Association football defenders
Argentine expatriate footballers
Primera Nacional players
Argentine Primera División players
Campeonato Brasileiro Série A players
Defensa y Justicia footballers
Godoy Cruz Antonio Tomba footballers
Club Atlético Belgrano footballers
Esporte Clube Vitória players
Rosario Central footballers
Expatriate footballers in Brazil
Argentine expatriate sportspeople in Brazil